Jacob Churg (16 July 1910, Daŭhinava, Russian Empire – 27 July 2005, New York City) was a Russian Empire-born Polish-American pathologist. Churg, together with Lotte Strauss, has given his name to Churg–Strauss syndrome, now known as eosinophilic granulomatosis with polyangiitis.

Works 
Influence of Gonadotropic Hormone upon Complement in Rabbit’s Blood. Diss. med. 1936
Allergic Granulomatosis, Allergic Angiitis, and Periarteritis nodosa (mit L. Strauss). Am J Pathol 27 (1951) 277
Structural Basis of Renal Disease. 1968
Nephrology. 1979

Literature 
Eberhard J. Wormer: Angiologie - Phlebologie. Syndrome und ihre Schöpfer. München 1991, S. 23–30, VI–VII
E. Grishman, T. Faraggiana, V. S. Venkataseshan: The Jacob Churg Festschrift. Introduction. Am J Kidney Dis 10 (1987) 155
J. A. A. Hunter, Karl Holubar: Dr. Jacob Churg. Am J Dermatopathol 8 (1986) 358
American Men and Women in Science 2 (1986) 230
Who’s Who in America. 42nd ed. 1 (1982–1983) 583

See also
 Eosinophilic granulomatosis with polyangiitis (EGPA)
 Pathology
 List of pathologists

References

American pathologists
Icahn School of Medicine at Mount Sinai faculty
Emigrants from the Russian Empire to the United States
1910 births
2005 deaths